The Shire of Indigo, a local government area (LGA) in the Hume region of Victoria, Australia, lies in the north-east part of the state.

It includes the towns of Beechworth, Chiltern, Rutherglen and Yackandandah. It formed in 1994 from the amalgamation of the Shire of Rutherglen, Shire of Chiltern, Shire of Yackandandah and United Shire of Beechworth.

The Shire is governed and administered by the Indigo Shire Council; its seat of local government and administrative centre is located at the council headquarters in Beechworth, it also has service centres located in Chiltern, Rutherglen and Yackandandah. The Shire is named after the Indigo Valley and Indigo Creek, geographical features that meander through the LGA and into the Murray River.

In 2008, the BankWest Quality of Life Index rated Indigo fifteenth of 590 Australian local government areas.

Council

Current composition
As of 22 September 2016, the council is composed of seven councillors elected to represent an unsubdivided municipality.

The makeup of the council is as follows:

Administration and governance
The council meets in the council chambers at the council headquarters in the Beechworth Municipal Offices, which is also the location of the council's administrative activities. It also provides customer services at both its administrative centre in Beechworth, and its service centres in Chiltern, Rutherglen and Yackandandah.

Townships and localities
The 2021 census, the shire had a population of 17,368 up from 15,952 in the 2016 census

^ - Territory divided with another LGA

See also
 List of localities (Victoria)
 List of places on the Victorian Heritage Register in the Shire of Indigo

References

External links
Indigo Shire Council official website
Metlink local public transport map
Link to Land Victoria interactive maps

Local government areas of Victoria (Australia)
Hume (region)
 
Hume Highway